Benton Township is one of sixteen townships in Cass County, Iowa, USA.  As of the 2000 census, its population was 171.

Geography
According to the USGS, it contains two cemeteries: Highland and Saint Josephs.

References

External links
 US-Counties.com
 City-Data.com

Townships in Cass County, Iowa
Townships in Iowa